Timothy or Tim Fox may refer to:

Timothy Fox (divine) (1628–1710), Anglican divine
Timothy Davis Fox (born 1957), Arkansas judge
Tim Fox (American football) (born 1953), American football player
Tim Fox (politician) (born 1957), American lawyer, Attorney General of Montana
Timothy Fox (character), fictional character appearing in comics published by DC Comics